Own Your Ghost is the second studio album by 13 & God, a collaboration between American hip hop group Themselves and German rock band The Notwist. It was released on Anticon and Alien Transistor in 2011.

Critical reception

At Metacritic, which assigns a weighted average score out of 100 to reviews from mainstream critics, the album received an average score of 74, based on 12 reviews, indicating "generally favorable reviews".

Brian Howe of Pitchfork gave the album a 6.0 out of 10, saying: "It's still a neat project with many moments of interest, but it's disappointing that the second album doesn't cohere overall any better than the first." Eric Hill of Exclaim! commented that "Own Your Ghost wins with a rare combination of velocity and depth to track and tackle these troubled times." Mary Kosearas of Filter gave the album a rating of 81%, stating: "Ten tracks mixed with complex beats and sharp vocals gradually mature into a harmony of both fresh and electronically manipulated sounds."

Cokemachineglow named it the 42nd best album of 2011.

Track listing

Personnel
Credits adapted from liner notes.

13 & God
 Adam "Doseone" Drucker
 Jeffrey "Jel" Logan
 Dax Pierson
 Jordan Dalrymple
 Markus Acher
 Micha Acher
 Martin Gretschmann

Additional musicians
 Jorg Widmoser – violin
 Andreas Horicht – viola
 Mathias Gotz – trombone
 Ivica Vucelic – Saba FBW3
 Stefan Schreiber – saxophone, bass clarinet

Technical personnel
 Olli Zulch – recording, mixing, additional production
 Jay Pellicci – recording
 Adam "Doseone" Drucker – artwork
 Stefan Garanin – cover skeleton

Charts

References

Further reading

External links
 
 

2011 albums
13 & God albums
Anticon albums